Phlegmariurus talpiphilus is a species of plant in the family Lycopodiaceae. It is endemic to Ecuador. Its natural habitat is subtropical or tropical high-altitude grassland. It is threatened by habitat loss.

References

talpiphilus
Endemic flora of Ecuador
Vulnerable plants
Taxonomy articles created by Polbot
Taxobox binomials not recognized by IUCN